The following is the list of World War I aces from Australia. During the war Australian pilots served in a range of units in the Australian Flying Corps (AFC) and in the British Royal Naval Air Service (RNAS), Royal Flying Corps (RFC) and later the Royal Air Force (RAF). Australia was the only Dominion to have its own independent air arm during the war. Pilots were considered to be "aces" after they had shot down five or more enemy aircraft; 81 Australians are believed to have achieved this feat, with the highest scorer being Robert Alexander Little, who is credited with 47 air victories.

Australian WWI aces

See also
Aerial victory standards of World War I

Notes

References

 
 

Australia
 
Aces
Australian military-related lists